The Sham  Stakes is a Grade III American Thoroughbred horse race for horses aged three years old over the distance of one mile on the dirt scheduled annually in January at Santa Anita Park in Arcadia, California.  The event currently carries a purse of $100,000.

History

The event was inaugurated on 9 February 2001 over a distance of  miles and was won by the US Hall of Fame trained Bob Baffert's Wild and Wise who was entered as an entry with Special Times. He was ridden by the entry with Special Times. He was ridden by the US Hall of Fame jockey Victor Espinoza winning by half a length in a time of 1:50.51.

The event is named in honor for the racehorse Sham, winner of the 1973 Santa Anita Derby and remembered for his battles with Secretariat in that year's U.S. Triple Crown Races.

The event was upgraded to Grade III in 2006. 

In 2011 distance for the event was decreased to  miles and once again the following year was decreased to 1 mile. Since 2011 the event has been held early in January.

An official prep race for the Kentucky Derby with qualification points.

Records
Speed  record:
 1 mile –  1:34.56 - Out of Bounds (2012)  
  mile – 1:47.86 - The Pamplemousse (2009) 

Margins: 
  lengths –  Authentic  (2020) 

Most wins by a jockey:
 4 - Alex Solis (2003, 2004, 2009, 2010)
 4 - Garrett Gomez (2007, 2008, 2011, 2012)
 4 - Victor Espinoza (2001, 2005, 2006, 2017)
 4 - Mike E. Smith (2014, 2018, 2019, 2021)

Most wins by a trainer:
 9 - Bob Baffert (2001, 2006, 2014, 2016, 2018, 2020, 2021, 2022, 2023)

Most wins by an owner:
 3 - Golconda Stable (2020, 2022, 2023)
 3 - Madaket Stables (2020, 2022, 2023)
 3 - SF Racing (2020, 2022, 2023)
 3 - Starlight Racing (2020, 2022, 2023)

Winners  

Legend:

 
 

Notes:

§ Ran as an entry

See also
List of American and Canadian Graded races
Road to the Kentucky Derby

References

2001 establishments in California
Horse races in California
Santa Anita Park
Flat horse races for three-year-olds
Triple Crown Prep Races
Graded stakes races in the United States
Grade 3 stakes races in the United States
Recurring sporting events established in 2001